Pinocchiova dobrodružství II. is a 1970 Czechoslovak film directed by Zdenek Sirový. The film starred Josef Kemr, Ladislav Pesek, Josef Beyvl, and Frantisek Filipovský. Ladislav Pesek is credited as voice-acting Geppetto. It is based on the book The Adventures of Pinocchio By Carlo Collodi.

References

External links
 

1970 films
Pinocchio films
Czechoslovak animated films
1970s Czech-language films
Czech animated films
1970s Czech films